The Exploration Gateway Platform was a design concept proposed by Boeing in December 2011 to drastically reduce the cost of Moon, near Earth asteroids (NEAs), or Mars missions by using components already designed to construct a refueling depot and servicing station located at one of the Earth–Moon Lagrange points, L1 or L2. The system claims its cost savings based on an ability to be reused for multiple missions such as a launch platform for deep space exploration, robotic relay station for moon rovers, telescope servicing and a deep space practice platform located outside the Earth's protective radiation belts.

The platform would be constructed at the International Space Station (ISS) for testing before being relocated to EM-L1 or EM-L2 via electric or chemical propulsion rockets.

Construction
The Platform would consist of parts left over from the ISS program. Parts under consideration were Node 4 to form the main connection point, parts from the Space Shuttle's Orbital Maneuvering System (OMS) and Orbiter External Airlock would be combined to form a utility module for maneuvering, orientation and Extra-vehicular activity (EVA), a smaller version of the Canadian Arm to help with logistic and station-keeping, TransHab and/or possible inclusion of a 'Zvezda 2' or a Bigelow Inflatable station for life support systems, crew accommodations, storage, and laboratory space. Most components would be lifted into orbit using currently available EELV or commercial launchers.

A reusable lander would be positioned at the platform for Moon landings and refueled using NASA's new SLS heavy lift vehicle.

See also 
 Lunar Gateway
 Deep Space Habitat
 Lunar Orbital Station
 Nautilus-X
 Skylab II
 Space station

References 

Proposed space stations